Zoe Țapu (29 April 1934 — 11 February 2013) was a Romanian agronomist who created an original variety of durum wheat, adapted to the climate in Central and Eastern Europe and other similar regions of the world. She was described as a pioneer of durum wheat breeding in Romania.

Biography
She was born in Ploiesti, Romania and graduated from the University of Agronomic Sciences and Veterinary Medicine in Bucharest, earning the doctoral degree in agronomic sciences in 1974.

Since 1957 she worked at the newly founded Institute for Maize Breeding, and then at the Research Institute for Cereals and Industrial Crops, from 1962 to 1990, when she retired. 
In 1980 she received the Ion Ionescu de la Brad Prize of the Romanian Academy for her research on transgressive heredity in winter wheat. 
She died from heart failure in Ploiești on 11 February 2013.

Scientific achievements
Proving the possibility of obtaining high yield cultivars from parents with low productivity (through heterosis), between 1967 and 1989, Zoe Țapu developed a research program for improving winter durum wheat, in order to obtain cultivars with fall resistance and high yield, using height-reduction genes from summer durum developed at the International Maize and Wheat Improvement Center in Mexico. In order to achieve that, she used dwarf plants from CIMMYT, which survived to a mild winter, back-crossing them with Romanian durum wheat varieties. Repeated selection for cold resistance of semi-dwarf variants led to the creation of the first semi-dwarf winter durum wheat varieties, Topaz (1977) and Rodur (1984). This new type of wheat set the ground for further progress in durum wheat breeding in many countries.

Patented wheat varieties
Dacia 	(1971) 	T. Mureșan, A. Iazagi, N. Ceapoiu, N. Eustațiu, Clemența Miclea, C. Țapu, Zoe Țapu 	
Excelsior 	(1971) 	T. Mureșan, A. Iazagi, N. Ceapoiu, N. Eustațiu, Clemența Miclea, C. Țapu, Zoe Țapu 
Iulia 	(1974) 	N. Ceapoiu, N. Eustațiu, C. Țapu, Zoe Țapu, G. Ittu, M. Ionescu-Cojocaru, Floare Negulescu, T. Mureșan, A. Iazagi, Elena Oproiu, C. Milică 		
Ceres 	(1974) 	N. Ceapoiu, N. Eustațiu, C. Țapu, Zoe Țapu, G. Ittu, M. Ionescu-Cojocaru, Floare Negulescu, T. Mureșan, A. Iazagi, Elena Oproiu, C. Milică 	
Ileana 	(1974) 	N. Ceapoiu, N. Eustațiu, C. Țapu, Zoe Țapu, G. Ittu, M. Ionescu-Cojocaru, Floare Negulescu, T. Mureșan, A. Iazagi, Elena Oproiu, C. Milică 	
Diana 	(1976) 	N. Ceapoiu, N. Eustațiu, C. Țapu, Zoe Țapu, G. Ittu, M. Ionescu-Cojocaru, Floare Negulescu, T. Mureșan, A. Iazagi, Elena Oproiu, C. Milică 	
Doina 	(1977) 	N. Ceapoiu, N. Eustațiu, C. Țapu, Zoe Țapu, G. Ittu, M. Ionescu-Cojocaru, Floare Negulescu 
Topaz 	(1977) Zoe Țapu
Rodur 	(1984) Zoe Țapu
Pandur (1997) Zoe Țapu, P. Mustatea, N. Săulescu, G. Ittu,  Mariana Ittu

See also 
 Cecil Salmon
 Green Revolution
 Norman Borlaug
 Orville Vogel

Notes 

1934 births
2013 deaths
Romanian agronomists